Jean de Montfort or John of Montfort may refer to:

 John I of Montfort (died 1249), count of Montfort
 Jean de Montfort (died 1283), lord of Tyre and of Toron
 Jean de Montfort-Castres (died 1300), count of Squillace (kingdom of Naples), son of Philippe II de Montfort, lord of Castres, and of Jeanne de Lévis-Mirepoix
 John II of Montfort (1294–1345), count of Montfort, contested Duke of Brittany, one of two sides in the Breton War of Succession
 John IV, Duke of Brittany (1339–1399), son of the former, Duke of Brittany from 1364 to 1399, count of Richemont and count of Montfort (1345–1399)
 Jean de Montfort (1385–1414), who later took the name Guy XIII de Laval, Lord of Laval